Royal Pirates (로열 파이럿츠) is a Korean-American rock band which debuted in 2013. The band currently consists of Kim Moon-chul (vocals, guitar), and EXSY (drums).

Members 
Current members
 Moon Kim — lead vocalist, guitar 
 EXSY — drums 

Former members
 Richard Kim — bass 
 James Lee — bass guitar, keyboardist 

Temporary member
 Enik Lin — synth

History

2004-2008: Formation as Fading From Dawn, Richard's death, and renaming
From 2004, the group was formerly known as Fading From Dawn, with the three members being guitarist-vocalist Kim Moon-chul, drummer Soo-yoon (later changed his stage name to EXSY) and bassist Richard Kim, Moon-chul's older brother. They used to play at several Korean events in California, such as the annual Korean Festival in Orange County. After Richard's death in April 2008 in a car accident in Pomona, California, they rarely played live since they had no bass player. They also changed their band name to Royal Pirates.

2009-2012: Popularity, YouTube and demo releases

With their talent and originality, Royal Pirates gained fame on YouTube by uploading covers. In September 2008, Moon-chul and Soo-yoon posted their first cover "Time is Running Out" by Muse on their YouTube account. After that, they continued uploading rock versions of hit songs such as "Nobody" by Wonder Girls, "Mirotic" by DBSK, and "Circus" by Britney Spears, the latter reached 18 thousand viewers in just two weeks and was also featured on Britney's homepage.

Their first original demo was released on the internet was "Royal Villain". Soo-yoon's song "Like Butterflies" was also released soon after.

In May 2009, Royal Pirates appeared on Korean News Channel YTN where they were presented as an independent rock band who had become a new YouTube sensation, garnering over ten thousand views with their powerful instrumentals and brilliant videos.

They covered the song "Sorry Sorry" by Super Junior in Spring 2009. After the video was posted on the Korean website Cyworld, the band received an invitation from the writer of Star King to appear on his show. However, the band declined the invitation since they had "major conflicts with school" and "scheduling was difficult for both of [them]". They also did not want to portray themselves as a "Cover Band" to the world and to Korea.

James Lee joined Royal Pirates as a bassist in September 2009, and in October 2009, Royal Pirates appeared on KOME channel to introduce their new bassist.

In March 2010, Royal Pirates released the music video for their new original song and demo "Disappear". They declared, "This is not the actual debut of Royal Pirates. This MV was made independently for the fans and also for promotion of the band."

2013-present: Official Debut, Drawing the Line, Japanese debut, world tour, and James's departure

Royal Pirates made their Korean debut on August 25, 2013 at Inkigayo with their digital single "Shout Out".

On January 15, 2014, Royal Pirates released their first EP in Korea "Drawing The Line.

On March 24th 2014, Royal Pirates released their first album in Japan "Shout Out", which also included English versions of the songs Shout Out, Drawing The Line and Fly To You.

Royal Pirates performed on several music programs as guests of Kim Kyung Rok of "VOS".

The band also performed on a world tour with actor Lee Min Ho. As guests on the Reboot: Minho Tour, they performed at venues in South Korea, Japan, China and more.

On August 27, 2014, Royal Pirates released their second EP "Love Toxic", which included the English versions of the songs "Betting Everything" and "You". The band then later released a Taiwanese Deluxe version of their "Love Toxic" EP, featuring tracks from the "Drawing The Line" EP, as well as a Japanese edition, which included the Japanese version of the title track "Love Toxic".

On November 30th, 2015, the 3 members of Royal Pirates returned with a 6 track EP titled "3.3". Their title track "Run Away" was made into a music video. Prior to this comeback, member James Lee had a nearly-fatal freak accident which caused him to give up playing the bass after 13 years. However, he returned to play the keyboard for the music video of "Run Away". Enik Lin of EDM group IAMMEDIC also helped write and produce the track, and can be seen in the music videos for both "Run Away" and "Dangerous".

James Lee announced his departure from the band on January 31, 2017 via a handwritten letter on his Instagram account.

Discography

EPs

Singles

Filmography

Music videos

Awards 
Energy FM KPOP-Hall of Fame Award "Love Toxic" (October 12-November 2, 2014)

Exclusive Video

RP TV 
Published on official YouTube channel.

References

External links
 Royal Pirates Official Website

Musical groups established in 2004
South Korean pop rock music groups
South Korean rock music groups
K-pop music groups
Musical trios
English-language singers from South Korea
Rock music groups from California